John Lowe (1899–1960) was Dean of Christ Church, Oxford, England (1939–59) and Vice-Chancellor of the University of Oxford (1948–51).

Life
Born in Calgary, Alberta, Canada, he studied at Trinity College, Toronto and went on to the University of Oxford as a Rhodes scholar (1922). He returned to Trinity College, where he taught for twelve years, serving as Dean of Divinity (1933–39), before taking up his post at Christ Church, Oxford.

Selected works
The Lord's prayer (Oxford: Clarendon Press, 1962)
Saint Peter (Oxford: Clarendon Press, 1956)
The interpretation of the Lord's prayer (Evanston: Seabury-Western Theological Seminary, 1955)
Diocese of Oxford: The cathedral handbook (Oxford: n.p., 1955)

References

Further reading
 The Munificent Monsieur, Time, 27 September 1948.
 A Question of Continuity, Time, 15 November 1948.

External links
 Details about portraits at the National Portrait Gallery

1899 births
1960 deaths
People from Calgary
Trinity College (Canada) alumni
University of Toronto alumni
Canadian Rhodes Scholars
Academic staff of the University of Toronto
Deans of Christ Church, Oxford
Vice-Chancellors of the University of Oxford
Canadian Anglican priests
Place of death missing